

Persons with the given name 
Manav Gohil (born 1974), Indian Gujarati actor
Manav Gupta (born 1967), Indian Bengali artist
Manav Dayal I.C.Sharma, Indian Punjabi philosopher, sant, and yogi
Manav Kaul (born 1976), Indian theatre director, playwright, actor and film-maker
Manav Vij, Indian Punjabi actor

People
Manavlar or Manav Turks (Greengrocers); are Hanafi Sunni Turkish people living in northwest Anatolia, especially in Manavgat, Sakarya, Bilecik, Balıkesir, Bursa, Çanakkale, Kocaeli, Eskişehir, Bolu and Düzce provinces. Manavlar are based on various Turkish peoples such as Uyghur, Karluk, Çiğil, Halaç, Kazakh, and Kyrgyz who settled in the Seljuk period in Anatolia and came from Central Asia.

See also
Manav Hatya, 1986 Hindi film
Manav Kendra (literally "Man-making Center") or Lighthouse Center
Manava
Manavand (disambiguation)
Manavi
Manavur
Manavya

References